Yaqubabad is a neighborhood in Orangi Town in Karachi, Sindh, Pakistan.

There are several ethnic groups including Muhajirs, Sindhis, Kashmiris, Seraikis, Pakhtuns, Balochis, Memons, Bohras Ismailis, etc.

References

External links 
 Karachi Website

Neighbourhoods of Karachi
Orangi Town